Wide Open Live & More! is the first DVD release by American country music artist Jason Aldean. Filmed March 6, 2009, during Aldean's sold-out concert at Knoxville Coliseum, Knoxville, TN, and released August 25, 2009, the DVD additionally includes the music video for Aldean's then-recent #1 single, "Big Green Tractor".

Set list
 "Wide Open" 
 "I Break Everything I Touch" 
 "Amarillo Sky" 
 "Why" 
 "Big Green Tractor" 
 "On My Highway" 
 "Johnny Cash" 
 "Relentless" 
 "You're the Love I Wanna Be In" 
 "Laughed Until We Cried" 
 "I Use What I Got" 
 "She's Country" 
 "Asphalt Cowboy" 
 "Hicktown"

Certifications

References

Jason Aldean video albums
2009 video albums
Live video albums
2009 live albums
2000s English-language films